Independence Community Bank was a bank based in Brooklyn, New York. In 2006, the bank was acquired by Santander Bank.

History
The bank was originally chartered in 1850 as South Brooklyn Savings Bank. George A. Jarvis was one of the 26 co-founders and was vice president for 33 years. James S. T. Stranahan was also a co-founder.

In 1975, the name of the bank was changed to Independence Savings Bank. The bank acquired Long Island City Savings and Loan Association in 1992. Four years later, Independence Savings Bank acquired Bay Ridge Federal Savings Bank for $144 million in cash. In 1998, the bank converted from a mutual organization to a joint-stock company and became a public company via an initial public offering. The same year, the bank changed its name to Independence Community Bank. Independence Community Bank acquired SI Bank & Trust in 2004 and was itself acquired by Santander Bank two years later.

References

Banks established in 1850
Defunct banks of the United States
Banks disestablished in 2006
1850 establishments in New York (state)